The Edna Valley AVA is an American Viticultural Area located in San Luis Obispo County, California encompassing the rural town of Edna, which is south of the county seat San Luis Obispo and north of the small coastal town Arroyo Grande.  It is a sub-region of the larger Central Coast AVA.  The valley is roughly bounded by Lake Lopez to the south and Islay Hill to the north.  The valley runs east to west, bounded to the west by the Santa Lucia Mountains. It is surrounded by volcanic mountains and characterized by black humus and clay-rich soils. With moderate sunshine, cool maritime fog, and rich oceanic and volcanic soils, the Edna Valley appellation has California's longest growing season. The valley is kept cool by breezes from the Pacific Ocean and morning fog. The extended growing season gives complex flavors to the grapes.

 The region is best known for Chardonnay, Pinot noir, and to a lesser extent, Syrah.  Grapes were originally planted here by Spanish missionaries in the early 19th century. The region saw a revival when new vineyards were planted in the early 1970s by what is known today as Edna Valley Vineyard. Edna Valley wines are often grouped with those of the contiguous Arroyo Grande Valley AVA. The AVA was designated in 1982, with help from the founders of what today is the Edna Valley Vineyard.

References

External links

Touring the Edna Valley at Sunset Magazine

American Viticultural Areas of California
Geography of San Luis Obispo County, California
Valleys of San Luis Obispo County, California
American Viticultural Areas
American Viticultural Areas of Southern California
1982 establishments in California